Tatiana (or Tatianna, also romanized as Tatyana,  Tatjana, Tatijana, etc.) is a female name of Sabine-Roman origin that became widespread in Eastern Europe.

Variations

Origin 

Tatiana is a feminine, diminutive derivative of the Sabine —and later Latin— name Tatius. King Titus Tatius was the name of a legendary ruler of the Sabines, an Italic tribe living near Rome around the 8th century BC. After the Romans absorbed the Sabines, the name Tatius remained in use in the Roman world, into the first centuries of Christianity, as well as the masculine diminutive Tatianus and its feminine counterpart, Tatiana.

While the name later disappeared from Western Europe including Italy, it remained prevalent in the Hellenic world of Eastern Roman Empire, and later spread to the Byzantine-influenced Orthodox world, including Russia. In that context, it originally honored the church Saint Tatiana, who was tortured and martyred in the persecutions of the Roman Emperor Alexander Severus, circa 230 CE. St. Tatiana is patron saint of students in general and in Russia, students are celebrated on Tatiana Day, January 25. St Tatiana is also patron saint of Moscow State University.

In popular culture 

Tatiana Larina is the heroine of Alexander Pushkin's verse novel Eugene Onegin. The poem was and continues to be extremely popular in Russia.

The character of Tatiana Larina inspired the names of two Romanovs: Princess Tatiana Constantinovna of Russia and her distant cousin Grand Duchess Tatiana Nikolaevna of Russia.

Tatyana is also an important non-player character in the 5th edition Dungeons & Dragons adventure book Curse of Strahd.

Notable people

In Christianity 

 Saint Tatiana, 3rd-century Christian martyr

Royalty and nobility 

 Princess Tatiana Constantinovna of Russia (1890-1979), eldest daughter of Russian poet Grand Duke Constantine Constantinovich of Russia.
 Grand Duchess Tatiana Nikolaevna of Russia (1897 - 1918), the second daughter of Emperor Nicholas II Romanov and Empress Alexandra Feodorovna (Alix of Hesse).
 Princess Tatiana Radziwiłł (born 1939), daughter of Princess Eugénie of Greece and Denmark.
 Princess Tatiana of Greece and Denmark (born 1980), wife of Prince Nikolaos of Greece and Denmark
 Princess Tatiana Galitzine (born 1984), daughter of Archduchess Maria-Anna of Austria

In modeling 

 Tatiana Cotliar, Argentine model
 Tatiana Dante, fashion model and America's Next Top Model Cycle 4 candidate
 Taťána Kuchařová, Czech model, Miss World 2006
 Tatjana Patitz, German model
 Tatiana Sorokko, Russian model

In television and films 
 Tatiana (singer), Mexican American actress, singer and television presenter
 Tatiana Maslany, Canadian actress
 Tatiana Papamoschou, Greek actress
 Tatiana Pauhofová, Slovak actress
 Tatiana Samoilova, Soviet/Russian actress
 Tatiana Stefanidou, Greek television host
 Tatiana Vilhelmová, Czech actress
 Tatianna, American drag queen and reality personality
 Tatjana Saphira, Indonesian actress
 Tatjana Šimić, Croatian-Dutch actress and singer
 Tatyana Ali, actress and singer
 Tatyana Dogileva, Soviet/Russian actress
 Taťjana Medvecká, Czech actress

In music 

 Princess Tatiana von Fürstenberg, daughter of Prince Egon and Diane Von Fürstenberg; singer in the band Playdate
 Tatiana Borodina, Russian opera soprano
 Tatiana Bulanova, Russian pop singer
 Tatiana Cameron, Croatian-born pop singer (formerly known as "Tajci")
 Tatiana DeMaria, English musician
 Tatiana Kotova (born 1985), Russian singer, actress, and television presenter
 Tatiana Okupnik, Polish singer, based in London
 Tatiana Shmailyuk (born 1987), Ukrainian singer, frontwoman of the metal band Jinjer

In other performing arts 

 Tatiana Mamaki, Greek dancer and choreographer
 Tatiana Troyanos, opera singer

In sports 

 Jessica Long American Paralympic gold medalist born Tatiana Olegovna Kirillova
 Tathiana Garbin, Italian tennis player
 Tatiana Calderón (born 1993), Colombian racing driver
 Tatiana Cocsanova (born 2004), Canadian rhythmic gymnast
 Tatiana Golovin, French tennis player of Russian origin
 Tatiana Grigorieva, Australian athlete of Russian origin
 Tatiana Gutsu, Ukrainian Olympic Gymnast
 Tatiana Kavvadia, Greek basketball player
 Tatiana Khalil (born 1992), Lebanese footballer
 Tatiana Kosheleva, Russian Volleyball Player
 Tatiana Kosintseva, Russian international chess Grandmaster
 Tatiana Kyriushyna (born 1989), Ukrainian handball player
 Tatiana Lemos, Brazilian freestyle swimmer
 Tatiana Matveeva (footballer) (born 1990), Georgian footballer
 Tatiana Matveyeva (born 1985), Russian weightlifter
 Tatiana Nabieva, Russian artistic gymnast
 Tatiana Panova, Russian tennis player
 Tatiana Perebiynis, Ukrainian tennis player
 Tatiana Poutchek, Belarusian tennis player
 Tatiana Sousa, Greek handball player
 Tatjana Burmazovic, Serbian volleyball player
 Tatjana Malek, German tennis player
 Tatjana Schoenmaker (born 1997), South African swimmer
 Tatsiana Piatrenia (born 1981), Belarusian trampoline gymnast
 Tatyana Alekseyeva, Russian 400 metre runner
 Tatyana Biryulina, Soviet javelin thrower
 Tatyana Fomina (born 1954), Estonian chess player
 Tatyana Konstantinova, Russian hammer thrower
 Tatyana Lesovaya, Russian discus thrower
 Tatyana Polovinskaya, Ukrainian long-distance runner
 Tatyana Skachko, Russian long jumper
 Tatiana Sorina, Russian cross-country skier 
 Tatyana Sudarikova, Kyrgyzstani javelin thrower
 Tatyana Yurchenko (born 1993), Kazakhstani middle-distance runner
 Taťána Kocembová, Czechoslovak runner
 Tatiana Weston-Webb, Brazilian–American surfer

In literature and other fiction 

 Tatiana de Rosnay, author of the fiction Sarah's Key
 Tatiana Gritsi-Milliex, Greek writer and journalist
 Tatiana Larina, the love interest in Alexander Pushkin's celebrated novel-in-verse Eugene Onegin
 :fr:Tatiana Metanova, in Paullina Simon's "Bronze Horseman"
 Tatiana Romanova, James Bond's love interest in the 1963 movie From Russia with Love (film)
 Tatiana Taylor, in Auf Wiedersehen, Pet
 Tatiana Wisla, in the anime series Last Exile
 Tatiana, in the Kingdom TV series
 Tatiana, the main antagonist of the video game No Straight Roads
 Tatianna, in Fire Emblem Gaiden who also appears in the remake of the game, Fire Emblem Echoes: Shadows of Valentia
 Tatyana Tolstaya, modern Russian writer, granddaughter of Aleksei Tolstoy
 Princess Tatiana, from an episode of The Lion King's Timon and Pumbaa (Once Upon a Timon)
 Queen Tatiana, supporting character of the cancelled Nickelodeon sitcom The Other Kingdom
 EVA, character in Metal Gear Solid 3: Snake Eater  who uses the name Tatiana as one of her cover identities
 Scythe, real name Tatjana. Character in Stormwatch (comics). A Serbian superhero and a member of Stormwatch

Others
 Tatyana Andropova (1917–1991), spouse of Yuri Andropov 
 Tatiana Hambro (born 1989), British fashion writer and editor
 Tatyana Kostyrina (1924–1943), Soviet military hero
 Tatjana Pašić (born 1964), Serbian politician
 Tatiana Potîng (born 1971), Moldovan politician
 Tatiana de la tierra (1961–2012), Latina lesbian writer
 Tatiana Vivienne, feminist activist from the Central African Republic
 Tati Westbrook (born 1982), American Internet personality, YouTuber, businesswoman and makeup artist
 Tatjana Michaylovna Zacharova (born 1931), Russian production worker, author and politician

Animals 

 Tatiana (tiger), a San Francisco zoo animal who maimed and killed before being shot and killed

Variations of the name 

 Belarusian: Таццяна (Tatsiana; Łacinka: Tacciana), Diminutive: Таня (Tania), Тацянка (Tatsianka; Łacinka: Tacianka), Танечка (Taniechka; Łacinka: Taniečka)
 Bulgarian: Татяна (Tatyana), Diminutive: Таня (Tania)
 Catalan: Tatiana, Diminutive: Tània
 Czech: Taťána
 Dutch: Tanja, Tatjana (uncommon), Tania (uncommon now, only in Belgium)
 English: Tatiana, Diminutive: Tanya, Tania, Tatty, Tattie
 French: Tatiana, Tatianna, Tatyanna, Tatienne (uncommon), Diminutive: Tania, Tanya
 Frisian: Tetje Anna (uncommon) Diminutive: Tet, Tetje, Tanje
 German: Tatjana, Tanja
 Greek: Τατιανή (Tatiani), Τατιάνα (Tatiana)
 Hungarian: Tatjána
 Italian: Tatiana
 Norwegian: Tatjana
 Polish: Tacjana
 Portuguese: Tatiana, Tatiane, Diminutive: Tania, Tati
 Romanian: Tatiana, Tatianna, Diminutive: Tanea
 Russian: Татьяна (Tatijana), Diminutive: Таня (Tania), Tanichka, Tanechka, Tatianka, Taniusha, Taniushka
 Serbian Cyrillic: Татјана
 Slovakian: Tatiana, Diminutive: Táňa
 Slovene: Tatjana, Diminutive: Tanja, Variants: Tatiana, Tatijana, Tatja, Tatjanca
 Spanish: Tatiana, Diminutive: Tania, Tati
 Ukrainian: Тетяна (Tetiana, Tetyana), Diminutive: Tetianka, Tetyanka

See also 

 Tatian (disambiguation)

Russian feminine given names
Greek feminine given names
Italian feminine given names
Spanish feminine given names
Portuguese feminine given names
Romanian feminine given names
Serbian feminine given names
Slovene feminine given names
Croatian feminine given names
Bulgarian feminine given names
Polish feminine given names
Slovak feminine given names
Czech feminine given names